Let's Be Closer Together is an album by Tyrone Davis, released in 1977. It was his second Columbia Records release. It was remastered and expanded through Funkytowngrooves in 2015.

Singles

The album's lead single, "This I Swear", reached No. 6 on the Billboard Hot Soul Singles chart, while the follow up, "All You Got", peaked at No. 32 on the same chart.

Critical reception
Billboard wrote that Davis "provides a particularly neat package of pleasing material delivered in his roguishly appealing bad-little-boy style."

Track listing
"All You Got" (Leo Graham) – 6:06
"I Just Can't Keep On Going" (James Mack, Leo Graham) - 4:34
"If That's What It Takes" (Leo Graham) - 4:28
"Playing in the Sand" (Leo Graham) - 5:22
"This I Swear" (Leo Graham) - 5:55
"I Got Carried Away" (Leo Graham) - 5:02
"You Need Love" (Leo Graham) - 3:33
"Let's Be Closer Together" (James Mack, Leo Graham)- 5:41

Bonus tracks

Charts

References

External links
 

1977 albums
Tyrone Davis albums
Columbia Records albums
Albums produced by Leo Graham (songwriter)